Parc-de-la-Montagne-Saint-Raymond District (District 8) is a municipal district in the city of Gatineau, Quebec. Its seat on Gatineau City Council is now occupied by Marc Bureau, former mayor of Gatineau, who won a by-election, following the death of Louise Boudrias.

The district is located in the Hull sector of the city, and contains the neighbourhoods of Lac-des-Fées, most of Parc-de-la-Montagne and the northern half of Wrightville.

The district was created for the 2013 election, when Wright–Parc-de-la-Montagne District and Saint-Raymond–Vanier District merged.

Councillors
Louise Boudrias, Independent (2013–2022)
Marc Bureau, Independent (2022–present)

Election results

2022 by-election
A by-election was held October 23, 2022, following the death of Louise Boudrias. The results are as follows:

2021

2017

2013

References

Districts of Gatineau